The Thundermans is an American comedy television series created by Jed Spingarn that aired on Nickelodeon from October 14, 2013 to May 25, 2018. The series stars Kira Kosarin, Jack Griffo, Addison Riecke, Diego Velazquez, Chris Tallman, Rosa Blasi, and Maya Le Clark, and features the voice of Dana Snyder as Dr. Colosso. In March 2023, a follow-up film titled The Thundermans Return was announced.

Plot 
The series revolves around the Thundermans, a family with superpowers who try to live normal lives in the fictional town of Hiddenville. Phoebe dreams of being a superhero and using her powers for good, while her twin brother Max wants to be the next big supervillain and use his powers for evil. Parents Hank and Barb attempt to live normal lives and not use their superpowers – albeit not very successfully – while Nora and Billy enjoy using theirs whenever possible. A former supervillain named Dr. Colosso has been transmogrified into a rabbit and lives in Max's lair in the basement, offering him advice on becoming a villain. 

At the end of the second season, Chloe is introduced as the baby sister.

During the third season, Phoebe starts training to become a superhero, while the master super villain, Dark Mayhem, trains Max to become a villain. At the end of the season, Dark Mayhem asks Max to prove he is a villain by taking away Phoebe's powers. However, Max chooses his family and becomes a superhero instead by helping them take down Dark Mayhem.

During the fourth season, Max and Phoebe, under their Thunder Twins team-up, are selected as candidates for membership to the elite Hero League team called the Z-Force. Halfway through the season, Phoebe accidentally absorbs Dark Mayhem's powers, which turn her evil, but her family saves her. At the end, Phoebe and Max become the new Z-Force leaders and enroll the Thundermans as members.

Episodes

Cast 

 Kira Kosarin as Phoebe Thunderman
 Jack Griffo as Max Thunderman
 Addison Riecke as Nora Thunderman
 Diego Velazquez as Billy Thunderman
 Chris Tallman as Hank Thunderman
 Rosa Blasi as Barb Thunderman
 Maya Le Clark as Chloe Thunderman (recurring, season 3; main, season 4)

Production 
On August 3, 2012, Nickelodeon announced The Thundermans as one of its upcoming live-action series. Shooting began in mid-February and extras were cast at that time and throughout the production at Paramount Studios in Los Angeles. Its pilot was shot in October 2012. On December 20, 2013, the series was renewed for a second season. The second season premiered on September 13, 2014. On March 4, 2015, the series was renewed for a third season. The third season premiered on June 27, 2015. On March 2, 2016, the series was renewed for a fourth season, which premiered on October 22, 2016. Nickelodeon ordered six additional episodes for the series' fourth season on May 16, 2017, which would take the series over 100 total episodes. On July 27, 2017, Nickelodeon released a statement to J-14, stating that the series has wrapped after four seasons and 103 produced episodes.

Reception

Ratings 
 

| link2             = List of The Thundermans episodes#Season 2 (2014–15)
| episodes2         = 24
| start2            = 
| end2              = 
| startrating2      = 1.56
| endrating2        = 2.18
| viewers2          = |2}} 

| link3             = List of The Thundermans episodes#Season 3 (2015–16)
| episodes3         = 25
| start3            = 
| end3              = 
| startrating3      = 2.42
| endrating3        = 2.43
| viewers3          = |2}} 

| link4             = List of The Thundermans episodes#Season 4 (2016–18)
| episodes4         = 29
| start4            = 
| end4              = 
| startrating4      = 1.96
| endrating4        = 1.39
| viewers4          = |2}} 
}}

Awards and nominations

Film 
On March 2, 2023, it was announced that Nickelodeon greenlit a film titled The Thundermans Return, starring returning cast members Kira Kosarin, Jack Griffo, Addison Riecke, Diego Velazquez, Maya Le Clark, Chris Tallman, and Rosa Blasi. Filming will begin in Los Angeles in April 2023.

Notes

References

External links 
 

2010s American children's comedy television series
2010s Nickelodeon original programming
2013 American television series debuts
2018 American television series endings
English-language television shows
Television series about families
Television series about twins